Milena Ludwig (17 February 1927 – 29 June 2011) was a Luxembourgian athlete. She competed in the women's long jump at the 1948 Summer Olympics.

References

1927 births
2011 deaths
Athletes (track and field) at the 1948 Summer Olympics
Luxembourgian female long jumpers
Olympic athletes of Luxembourg
Place of birth missing